"In the Middle" is a song by the Mamas. It was performed in Melodifestivalen 2021 and made it to the 13 March final.

Charts

References

2021 songs
2021 singles
Melodifestivalen songs of 2021
Songs written by Jimmy Jansson
Swedish songs